or  is the administrative center of the municipality of Snåsa in Trøndelag county, Norway. The village is situated on the northern end of the lake of Snåsavatnet, just northeast of the village of Jørstad and southwest of the village of Agle.

The village grew up around the Viosen area on the shore of the lake.  Today, much of the village is located further inland.  The Nordlandsbanen railway line runs through the village, stopping at Snåsa Station. Snåsa Church, built in 1200, is also located in the village.

Name
The village is named after the old prestegjeld of Snåsa. The Old Norse form of the name was Snǫs. The name is identical with the word snös which means "prominent mountain" or "overhanging rock" (possibly referring to the mountain of Bergsåsen, at the inner end of the lake Snåsavatnet). The name was spelled Snaasen until the early 20th century.

Notable people

Media gallery

References

Snåsa
Villages in Trøndelag